Kimberley Charles Rew (born 3 December 1951) is an English rock singer-songwriter and guitarist. He is best known as a member of Katrina and the Waves from 1981 to 1999 and of Robyn Hitchcock's Soft Boys from 1978 to 1981. Two of his better-known compositions, both written for Katrina and the Waves, are "Walking on Sunshine" and "Love Shine a Light", performed by Katrina and the Waves as the United Kingdom's entry at the Eurovision Song Contest 1997, taking the country to its first victory in the contest since 1981.

Life and career
His family is from Bristol and moved house several times during his boyhood before he arrived at Jesus College, Cambridge in 1971, and settled in that city. After a brief excursion into archaeology at West Stow Anglo-Saxon Village and gaining a degree in archaeology from Cambridge, Rew formed the Waves with Alex Cooper in 1975, before joining the Soft Boys in 1978, recording the A Can of Bees and Underwater Moonlight albums.

In 1981, Robyn Hitchcock began his solo career; Rew and Cooper joined with Katrina Leskanich and Vince de la Cruz to form Katrina and the Waves. The group survived a slow career climb by tours of RAF bases and Canadian club gigs, then teamed up with the producers Pat Collier and Scott Litt to record Rew's compositions "Going Down to Liverpool", covered by The Bangles, and, in 1985, "Walking on Sunshine", which became the group's first and biggest hit.

In 1997, Katrina and the Waves won the Eurovision Song Contest for the United Kingdom with the Rew composition "Love Shine a Light".

In 1999, Katrina began her solo career. Rew continued to write, record and release solo albums.

From 1988 through to 2004, Rew was a guest member with the Cambridge band The Lonely. He played on four albums, Underground (1989), Rarer Gifts (1998) and Live (2000).

In 2001 Rew reunited and toured with Robyn Hitchcock, bassist Matthew Seligman, and Morris Windsor for the Soft Boys' re-release of their best-known album, 1980's Underwater Moonlight. The following year they recorded and released a new album, Nextdoorland, which was accompanied by a short album of outtakes, Side Three. The reunion was short-lived.

Celine Dion recorded the Rew composition "That's Just the Woman in Me" in 2007.

In the 1990s and 2000s, Rew completed a project to walk or cycle the coast of England and Wales and another to walk or cycle all of their navigable waterways.

Rew joined the Cambridge band Jack in 2004 (his wife Lee Cave-Berry had previously joined in 2000) and they are both still playing with the band (as of 2020).  Rew and his wife also perform as a duo called Kim and Lee.

Solo discography
The Bible of Bop, 1982
Tunnel into Summer, 2000
Great Central Revisited, 2003
Essex Hideaway, 2005
Ridgeway (EP), 2006
The Safest Place, 2010
Strawberry Fair, 2011
Technically Closer than Tooting, 2012
Healing Broadway, 2013
The Next Big Adventure, 2014

References

External links

Jack lineup

Alumni of Jesus College, Cambridge
English male singers
English songwriters
English male guitarists
English new wave musicians
People from Cambridge
Eurovision Song Contest winners
Eurovision Song Contest entrants for the United Kingdom
Living people
Katrina and the Waves members
The Soft Boys members
1951 births
British male songwriters